Dorothee Gisela Renate Maria Bär ( Mantel; born 19 April 1978) is a German politician of the Christian Social Union of Bavaria (CSU) who has been serving as a member of the German Bundestag since 2002. From 2014 to 2021, she served in various capacities in the government of Chancellor Angela Merkel.

Early life and education
Dorothee Bär, grew up in Ebelsbach, Landkreis Haßberge where she still lives.
She finished high school in Grayslake, Illinois in 1996 and Franz-Ludwig-Gymnasium in Bamberg in 1999.

Supported by a scholarship of the Hanns Seidel Foundation, Bär studied political science in several universities throughout Germany and received her diploma in 2005 from Otto-Suhr-Institut of the Free University of Berlin. After her graduation, she worked as a journalist for several radio stations and newspapers.

Political career
Bär started her political career in 1996 by joining the Young Union (JU), the youth organization of the CSU. In 1994 she became a member of the CSU. In 1999, she became a member of the Board of Directors of the Junge Union for the region of Lower Franconia. From 2001 to 2003, she served as the Chairperson of the Association of Christian Democratic Students (RCDS) of Bavaria.

Member of Parliament, 2002–present
Since the 2002 national elections, Bär has been a member of the German Parliament representing the Bad Kissingen electoral district (#248) which comprises three counties: Bad Kissingen, Rhön-Grabfeld, and Haßberge. Between 2005 and 2009, Bär was a member of the Committee on Foreign Affairs. Within her parliamentary group, she served as deputy spokesperson for foreign policy between 2008 and 2009, succeeding Karl-Theodor zu Guttenberg.

In November 2008 Bär was elected as the Deputy National Chairperson of the Young Union, under the leadership of chairman Philipp Mißfelder. In February 2009, she became the Deputy Secretary General of the CSU, serving alongside Secretary General Alexander Dobrindt under party chairman Horst Seehofer.

In the negotiations to form a coalition government following the 2009 federal elections, Bär was part of the CDU/CSU delegation in the working group on families, integration of immigrants and culture, led by Maria Böhmer and Hans-Joachim Otto. Between 2009 and 2013, she then served on the Committee on Family Affairs, Senior Citizens, Women and Youth as well as on the Committee on Cultural and Media Affairs.

In addition to her committee assignments, Bär was a member of the German-Korean Parliamentary Friendship Group and of the German-Swiss Parliamentary Friendship Group.

Since 2021, Bär has been serving as one her parliamentary group's deputy chairs, under the leadership of chair Ralph Brinkhaus. In this capacity, she oversees the group’s legislative activities on families and cultural affairs.

State Secretary for Transport and Digital Infrastructure, 2014–2018
In the coalition talks following the 2013 federal elections, Bär led the working group on digital policy; her co-chair was Brigitte Zypries of the SPD. In the third government under Chancellor Angela Merkel, she served as Parliamentary State Secretary in the Federal Ministry of Transport and Digital Infrastructure under the leadership of Minister Alexander Dobrindt. In this capacity, she was also the government’s Coordinator for Freight Transport and Logistics.

State Minister for Digitization, 2018–2021
In the negotiations to form a fourth cabinet under Merkel following the 2017 federal elections, Bär again led the working group on digital policy, this time alongside Helge Braun and Lars Klingbeil. Following the formation of the new government, she was appointed to the newly established post of State Minister for Digitization at the Federal Chancellery. Together with investor Frank Thelen she also been co-chaired the German Innovation Council at the Federal Chancellery.

Ahead of the 2021 elections, CDU chairman Armin Laschet included Bär in his eight-member shadow cabinet for the Christian Democrats’ campaign; she was the only CSU politician selected for this role.

Other activities

Government agencies
 Federal Agency for Civic Education (BpB), Member of the Board of Trustees (2005–2009)

Corporate boards
 FC Bayern München, Member of the Advisory Board (since 2019)
 ÖPP Deutschland AG, Ex-officio Member of the Supervisory Board (2013-2017)
 CNC Communications & Network Consulting, Member of the Board of Experts (2009–2013)
 Quadriga University of Applied Sciences Berlin, (2009–2013)
 Rhön-Klinikum, Member of the Advisory Board (2009–2013)
 RTL Television, Member of the Program Committee (2009–2013)

Non-profits
 University of Würzburg, Member of the Board of Trustees
 International Journalists’ Programmes (IJP), Member of the Board of Trustees
 AFS Intercultural Programs - Germany, Member of the Board of Trustees
 German Academy for Literature for Children and Young Adults, Member of the Advisory Board
 Kissinger Sommer, Member of the Board of Trustees
 cnetz, Member of the Advisory Board
 Total E-Quality initiative, Member of the Board of Trustees
 Wasserwacht of the Bavarian Red Cross, Chairwoman
 Atlantik-Brücke, Member
 2017 German Computer Games Award, Member of the Jury
 German Federal Film Board (FFA), Member of the Supervisory Board (2005–2013)

Political positions
Ahead of the 2021 national elections, Bär endorsed Markus Söder as the Christian Democrats' joint candidate to succeed Chancellor Angela Merkel.

Personal life

Bär is married to lawyer and fellow CSU politician Oliver Bär. The couple has two daughters and a son.

See also
List of Bavarian Christian Social Union politicians

References

External links

 Official Website of M.P. Dorothee Bär 
 M.P. Dorothee Bär in the Official Website of the German Parliament  -  - 
 M.P. Dorothee Bär in the Theo Catholic Magazine 
 M.P. Dorothee Bär in Handelsblatt 

1978 births
Living people
People from Bamberg
German Roman Catholics
Members of the Bundestag for Bavaria
Female members of the Bundestag
Free University of Berlin alumni
21st-century German women politicians
Members of the Bundestag 2021–2025
Members of the Bundestag 2017–2021
Members of the Bundestag 2013–2017
Parliamentary State Secretaries of Germany
Members of the Bundestag for the Christian Social Union in Bavaria